Vista Alegre may refer to:

Places 
Vista Alegre crater, a crater in Brazil
Vista Alegre City, a city in Brazil
Vista Alegre (Belo Horizonte), a neighbourhood of the Brazilian city of Belo Horizonte
Vista Alegre (Rio de Janeiro), a neighbourhood of the Brazilian city of Rio de Janeiro
Vista Alegre (São Paulo), a neighbourhood of the Brazilian city of São Paulo
Vista Alegre (Curitiba), a neighbourhood of the Brazilian city of Curitiba
Vista Alegre do Prata, a municipality in the Brazilian state of Rio Grande do Sul
Vista Alegre do Alto, a municipality in the Brazilian state of São Paulo
Vista Alegre (Asunción), a neighborhood of Asunción, Paraguay
Vista Alegre, São Tomé and Príncipe, a settlement of São Tomé Island in São Tomé and Príncipe
Vista Alegre (Madrid), a ward of Madrid, Spain
Vista Alegre (Metro Madrid), a station on Line 5
Vista Alegre (Uíge), a town and commune in Angola
Vista Alegre District, a district in Amazonas Region of Peru
Vista Alegre (Neuquén), a minor city located in Neuquén Province, Argentina
Vista Alegre, Panama, a corregimiento in Arraiján District, Panama
Vista Alegre, Darién, a village on the Tuira River, Darién Province, Panama

Other uses 
Vista Alegre (company), a Portuguese ceramics company